Mimic47 is the 4th album by Finnish melodic death metal band Diablo. It debuted at #1 on the Finnish albums chart.

Track listing
 "Shadow World" - 3:36
 "Damien" - 4:39
 "Together As Lost" - 3:36
 "In Sorrow We Trust" - 4:31
 "Mimic 47" - 3:10
 "Condition Red" - 4:46
 "Kalla" - 1:56
 "Blackheart" - 4:08
 "Kathryn" - 3:58
 "Rebellion of One" - 3:17
 "D.O.A." - 5:49

Personnel
 Rainer Nygård – Vocals, guitar
 Marko Utriainen – Guitar
 Aadolf Virtanen – Bass guitar
 Heikki Malmberg – Drums

References

2006 albums
Diablo (band) albums